"Sometimes" is a song recorded by Australian band Max Q. It was released in October 1989 as the band's second single from their debut self-titled album (1989).

Track listing
7"
 "Sometimes" (Straight Rock mix) – 3:42
 "Love Man" – 4:18

12"/CD Maxi
 "Sometimes" (Straight Rock mix) – 3:42
 "Sometimes" (Rock House extended mix) – 5:45
 "Love Man" – 4:18
 "Sometimes" (Dub mix) – 4:00

Charts

Release history

References

1989 songs
1989 singles
Max Q (Australian band) songs
CBS Records singles
Song recordings produced by Michael Hutchence
Song recordings produced by Ollie Olsen
Songs written by Ollie Olsen